Károly Polinszky (19 March 1922 – 15 August 1998) was a Hungarian chemical engineer and politician, who served as Minister of Education between 1974 and 1980.

References
 História – Tudósnaptár

1922 births
1998 deaths
Hungarian communists
Education ministers of Hungary